Epsilon Corvi (ε Crv, ε Corvi) is a star in the southern constellation of Corvus.

Epsilon Corvi is a red giant with a stellar classification of K2 III, having consumed the hydrogen at its core and evolved away from the main sequence. It has about three times the Sun's mass. The interferometry-measured angular diameter of this star is about 4.99 mas, which, at its estimated distance, equates to a physical radius of about 52 times the radius of the Sun. Around 4 times as massive as the Sun, it spent much of its life as a main sequence star of spectral type B5V.

References 

Corvus (constellation)
Corvi, Epsilon
Minkar
Corvi, 02
059316
K-type giants
4630
105707
Durchmusterung objects